Good News for Modern Man is the second studio album from Grant Hart, formerly of the band Hüsker Dü. It was released in 1999, ten years after Hart's previous studio album, Intolerance (1989).

The album was remastered and reissued by Hart’s Con d’Or label in 2014 with new album cover art.

Track listing
All songs written by Grant Hart.
 "Think It Over Now" (3:07)
 "Nobody Rides for Free" (4:32)
 "Run Run Run to the Centre Pompidou" (3:45)
 "You Don't Have to Tell Me Now" (3:44)
 "Teeny's Hair" (3:16)
 "A Letter From Anne Marie" (5:59)
 "In a Cold House" (5:02)
 "Seka Knows" (4:40)
 "Remains to Be Seen" (3:12)
 "Let Rosemary Rock Him, Laura-Louise" (1:32)
 "Little Nemo" (7:35)

Personnel
 Grant Hart – vocals, instruments, production
 Mato Nanji – lead guitar on "Seka Knows"
 Brent Sigmeth – production, engineering, mixing
 Anna Badger – engineering assistant
 Jed Luhmann – engineering assistant
 Neil Weir – engineering assistant
 Sean David Hank – engineering assistant

Notes

1999 albums
Grant Hart albums